NGC 165 is a barred spiral galaxy located in the constellation Cetus. It was discovered in 1882 by Wilhelm Tempel and was described by as "faint, large, star in centre, eastern of 2" by John Louis Emil Dreyer.

References

External links
 

0165
Barred spiral galaxies
Cetus (constellation)